The 2018 season was the 113th season of competitive football in Norway.

The season began in March, and ended in December with the 2018 Norwegian Football Cup Final.

Men's football

League season

Promotion and relegation

Eliteserien

1. divisjon

2. divisjon

Group 1

Group 2

3. divisjon

Group 1

Group 2

Group 3

Group 4

Group 5

Group 6

4. divisjon

Cup competitions

Norwegian Cup

Final

Mesterfinalen

Women's football

League season

Promotion and relegation

Toppserien

1. divisjon

2. divisjon

Norwegian Women's Cup

Final
LSK Kvinner 4–0 Sandviken

UEFA competitions

UEFA Champions League

Qualifying phase

First qualifying round

|}

Second qualifying round

|}

UEFA Europa League

Qualifying phase and play-off round (Champions path)

Third qualifying round

|}

Play-off round

|}

Qualifying phase and play-off round (Main Path)

First qualifying round

|}

Second qualifying round

|}

Third qualifying round

|}

Play-off round

|}

Group stage

Group B

Group I

UEFA Women's Champions League

Qualifying round

Group 10

Knockout phase

Round of 32

|}

Round of 16

|}
The tournament continued into the 2019 season.

National teams

Norway men's national football team

Friendlies
Norway also participated in four friendly matches.

2018–19 UEFA Nations League C 

During the season, the Norway national team played six games in the inaugural edition of the UEFA Nations League.

Group 3

Norway women's national football team

Friendlies

2018 Algarve Cup

Group A

Placement match
3rd placed teams

Seventh-place match

2019 FIFA Women's World Cup qualification (UEFA)

Group 3

References

 
Seasons in Norwegian football